A consumption map or efficiency map shows the brake-specific fuel consumption in g per kWh over mean effective pressure per rotational speed of an internal combustion engine.

The x-axis shows the rotational speed range. The y-axis represents the load on the engine. The contour lines show the specific fuel consumption, indicating the areas of the speed/load regime where the engine is more or less efficient.

The map contains each possible condition, combining rotational speed and mean effective pressure. It shows the result of specific fuel consumption. A typical rotation power output P (linear to  ) is reached on several locations on the map but differing in the amount of fuel consumption. Automatic transmissions, are designed to keep the engine at the speed with the lowest possible fuel consumption, given the power demand.

The map also shows the efficiency of the engine. Depending on the fuel type, diesel and gasoline engines reach up to 210 g/kWh and about 40% efficiency. Using natural gas this efficiency is reached at 200 g/kWh.

Average values are 160–180 g/kWh for slow moving two stroke diesel cargoship engines using fuel oil, reaching up to 55% efficiency at 300 rpm. 195–210 g/kWh at cooled and pre-charged diesel engines for passenger cars, trucks 195–225 g/kWh. Non-charged Otto cycle gasoline engines for passenger cars 250–350 g/kWh.

Literature 
 (German) Richard van Basshuysen: Handbuch Verbrennungsmotor, Fred Schäfer; 3. Auflage; 2005; Vieweg Verlag

References 

Internal combustion engine
Engine technology
Thermodynamics
Diagrams